West Martinsburg Historic District is a national historic district located at Martinsburg, Berkeley County, West Virginia. It encompasses 138 contributing buildings constructed between about 1900 and 1956.  It is primarily residential and many of the earlier houses in the district represent the “small house” movement of the 1920s and 1930s.  The houses reflect popular architectural styles from the first half of the 20th century including the Bungalow, American Craftsman, American Foursquare, and Colonial Revival styles.

It was listed on the National Register of Historic Places in 2010.

References

American Craftsman architecture in West Virginia
American Foursquare architecture in West Virginia
Bungalow architecture in West Virginia
Colonial Revival architecture in West Virginia
Historic districts in Martinsburg, West Virginia
Houses on the National Register of Historic Places in West Virginia
Houses in Martinsburg, West Virginia
Historic districts on the National Register of Historic Places in West Virginia